Vibration ( is a French regional radio station, created in 1982 and owned by the Sud Radio Groupe.

History
Vibration was founded in 1982. It was created as a regional station, mainly for the Centre region.

In the early 1990s, Vibration was bought by Groupe Start, which changed its name in 2010 to become Sud Radio Groupe.

Identity of Vibration

Logos

References

External links

Radio stations in France
Mass media in Orléans
Radio stations established in 1982
1982 establishments in France